Big Science may refer to:
 Big Science, a term used to describe changes in science since World War II 
 Big Science (Laurie Anderson album), a 1982 album by Laurie Anderson
 Big Science (BWO album), a 2009 album by BWO
 Big Science, a 2015 book by Michael Hiltzik